Brudalen is a farm in Ullensaker, Akershus, Norway.

Villages in Akershus